Yukon is the second most populous of Canada's three territories with 40,232 residents as of 2021. The remainder of the territory's land area is unorganized.

Municipal governments are created by the Government of Yukon in accordance with the Municipal Act of 2001. Municipal governments provide "jurisdiction services, facilities, or things that a local government considers necessary or desirable for all or part of its community". Classifications of municipalities under the Municipal Act include cities and towns. Whitehorse is the capital of Yukon and its only city. The remaining seven municipalities are towns, of which four were villages that were continued as towns upon adoption of the 2001 Municipal Act.

Over two-thirds of the population of Yukon (28,201 residents) reside in Whitehorse, the largest municipality in the territory.

Cities  
A proposal to incorporate a community as a city can be initiated under the Municipal Act at the request of Yukon's Minister of Community Services, a municipal council, or a minimum 30% of residents that are eligible electors if the community has an estimated population over 2,500. Cities must elect a mayor and six councillors (in the case of Whitehorse), or a mayor and eight councillors if authorized by bylaw, for a three-year term. The only city in Yukon is Whitehorse, which is the largest of the three cities in Northern Canada's three territories. The City of Dawson is a former city in Yukon that now has town status but is permitted to retain "city" in its official name.

Towns 
A proposal to incorporate a community as a town can be initiated under the Municipal Act at the request of the Minister of Community Services, a municipal council, or a minimum 30% of residents that are eligible electors if the community has an estimated population over 300. Towns must elect a mayor and four councilors, or a mayor and five to seven councillors if authorized by bylaw, for a three-year term. 

All municipalities that were villages prior to the adoption of the 2001 Municipal Act were continued as towns but were permitted to retain "village" in their official names. Yukon has seven towns. Dawson City is the territory's largest town by population with 1,577 residents and Faro is the largest by land area .

List of municipalities

See also 

 List of designated places in Yukon

Notes

References

External links 
Yukon Government: Department of Community Services

Municipalities